The 2021–22 Perth Scorchers season was the eleventh in the club's history. Coached by Adam Voges and captained by Mitchell Marsh they competed in the BBL's 2021–22 season. In the final, they beat Sydney Sixers to clinch their fourth BBL title.

Standings

Regular season

Playoffs

Squad information

The current squad of the Perth Scorchers for the 2021–22 Big Bash League season as of 22 February 2021.

 Players with international caps are listed in bold.

Notes

References 

Perth Scorchers seasons
2021–22 Australian cricket season